Gréco Casadesus (born 13 August 1951) is a French composer specializing in film scores. Born in Paris to a large family of artists (musicians, conductors, performers, actors, composers, painters, and writers), he has composed more than a hundred musical creations for television, cinema, performances, and theatre.

In his early years, he started out as an artistic director for EMI Classics, then set out to create music for the stage (1983-1997). From 1984 on, he started writing music for TV and cinema with a style combining orchestral music and electronics        (synthesizers and computer music).

Casadesus composed soundtracks for a diverse range of productions, such as Divertimento, with Kellan Lutz, Torrey DeVitto, Ola Rapace, Götz Otto by Keyvan Sheikhalishahi, The Climb, a fiction movie by the American director Bob Swaim, the animated film Babar: King of the Elephants, adapted from the classic French comic by Jean de Brunhof, or the TV series Jesus by Serge Moati. He also wrote seven hours of music for the restored version of the 1921 film Les Trois Mousquetaires, by Henri Diamant-Berger.

Fascinated by the genius of Étienne-Jules Marey (1830-1904), inventor of the first moving images, he wrote the symphonic suite Sept Mouvements de Vie in 2008, performed by an orchestra, as images by Marey were projected on a film screen. More recently, he composed the music score for several documentary films, such as La Guerre d'Hollywood, Jack London, une aventure américaine, and the TV series Jusqu'au dernier.

In 2002, he founded the Union des Compositeurs de Musiques de Films (UCMF), a lobbying group defending the interests of music creators. He remained its president until 2005, and then its honorary chairman. In 2003, Casadesus was nominated "Personality of the year" by the trade journal Musique Info Hebdo. In 2012 he was awarded the Henri-Langlois Award.

Biography

Early life and education 
Casadesus grew up in a family of artists. His father, Marius Casadesus (1892-1981), was a violinist and a composer, and his mother, Gladys Thibaud (1928), was a pianist. He began studying music with his parents, learning the violin at age 3 with his father, and piano at age 5 with his mother.

He grew up in Montmartre (Casadesus Square) in Paris, and from 9 years old, he studied at the Conservatoire de Paris, training 8 hours a day, which earned him the First Medal in theory as well as a prize in piano at the Versailles Conservatory.

He started his career at age 22 as an artistic director at EMI Classics, where he oversaw the recording of over 200 albums including artists such as Mstislav Rostropovich, Leonard Bernstein and Georges Prêtre. While in contact with these artists, he broadened his musical language and orchestration style.

By age 30, he wrote and recorded his first album, Voyage immobile, but after his second album, Les Oiseaux de rivière noire (1982), he focused on composing for the  cinema and stage.

Composing for the stage and for images 
Casadesus then became interested in the way music influenced the process of writing and directing a film or play. His first experiences in theatre and the strong working relation he enjoyed with the two stage directors allowed him to explore new sounds, for example, using new electronic sounds and synthesizers that had just appeared in the 1970s and 1980s. Between 1983 and 1997, he composed no less than 22 musical creations for the stage, mainly for Jean Danet's Les Tréteaux de France theatre company and the Théâtre du Marais of Jacques Mauclair. In particular, he composed the music for Molière's play, L'Avare, which was awarded a prestigious Molière Award in 1989 for the direction by Mauclair

Casadesus was then contacted by the American film director Bob Swaim, who hired him in 1997 to replace the famous composer John Barry and write the soundtrack for his feature film, The Climb, with John Hurt, Gregory Smith and David Strathairn.

In 1998, he composed the very first original soundtrack for Marie et le vin, a book by Claire Huynen published by Éditions du Cherche-Midi. The following year, Casadesus wrote the soundtrack for the cartoon Babar: King of the Elephants, by Canadian director Raymond Jafelice. In 1999, he wrote the score for an important TV project, Jésus, directed by Serge Moati. It was a huge success, reaching an audience of 10 million viewers during its unique broadcast, on Dec. 25 1999, on France's main television channel. In 2001, he wrote seven hours of music for the restored version of the 1921 film Les Trois Mousquetaires, an adaptation of the great French classic by Alexandre Dumas. Following this experience, he produced a live performance designed for children, entitled Les Trois Mousquetaires font du Cinéma, a production mixing theatre, cinema and musical theatre.

Leading large projects 
Casadesus gained some leadership among French composers, which led him to found in 2002 the French association of composers, Union des Compositeurs de Musiques de Films (UCMF). He spearheaded it until 2005, with an aim to promote and protect a profession in a changing environment. Now, he is UCMF's Honorary Chairman, along with Bernard Grimaldi. Casadesus then founded the production and publishing company Opus Millésime, and produced a film and a CD as a tribute to his cousin, the pianist and composer Robert Casadesus (1899-1972). In January 2004, he was nominated "Personality of the year" by the music magazine Musique Info Hebdo.

During the 2007 Cannes Film Festival, Casadesus' symphony Sept Mouvements de Vie, dedicated to the life and work of the photographer Étienne-Jules Marey, was played by the Orchestre Régional de Cannes Provence-Alpes-Côte d'Azur, conducted by Philippe Bender. Still inspired by Marey's chronophotographies, he wrote the missing movements of his symphony in 2008. The resulting « concert of images », using Marey's antique photos edited by director Sylvie-Jeanne Gander, was performed at the Dijon film festival, Rencontres cinématographiques de Dijon. This symphonical suite was published by Cezame Music Agency with the title Movements of Life, and a series of three films about the Marey project was released the following year. This project initiated a collaboration with the music label Cezame, run by Frédéric Leibovitz and Françoise Marchesseau, resulting in the publication of over 200 of his music tracks over the years.

Composing for documentary films 
Casadesus entered a new phase of collaborations, with the composition of soundtracks for various documentary films in France, in particular for directors Christian Zerbib (En terre étrangère and Nos ancêtres les Gauloises), Michel Viotte (La guerre d'Hollywood and Jack London, une aventure américaine), and William Karel (Jusqu'au dernier : La destruction des Juifs d'Europe). This last project was inspired by the 70th anniversary of the liberation of Auschwitz concentration camp. For this project, he composed several orchestral scores to be played by the famous American clarinetist David Krakauer.

"Shouting the infinity and never hearing it. Shouting an intimate pain, in silence. Giving a chance to hope, even if it is slim. Translating an unspeakable feeling that neither words nor images can express. Keeping a low profile. This was I was after", Casadesus said when his work was published in the album, David Krakauer plays Greco Casadesus. His work with Krakauer was also followed by a show at the French radio studios, France Musique. Both the soundtrack for the three TV films produced for this documentary project, and the Krakauer album, were published by Cézame

Training the next generation 
Casadesus was awarded the Henri Langlois Award for his career in 2012, and as a reference in the field of scoring, he is often requested to speak about the specificity of composing for images. "As a foundation for this complex mix between image and music, the composer has a tremendous power that is balanced by a potential and terrible sanction: as beautiful as the music he just wrote can be, if it doesn't fit the director's purpose, it will be discarded!" he says during his lectures, master-classes and training workshops.

One example of these training activities is the Music Score Lab ("Le laboratoire de musique de films"), which he created in 2013 along with Cristal Productions and the La Rochelle TV film festival (Festival de la fiction TV de La Rochelle). This yearly training allows selected composers to compose a soundtrack for a film sequence, and gives way to a small concert, with an orchestra playing in front of an audience the music composed by the trainees, synchronized with the images.

From 2013 to 2015, Casadesus has also been heading the Sacem's TV Commission (Commission de l'Audiovisuel).

Works 
Casadesus has written hundreds of original scores for theatre, film, television, concerts and other stage performances. He also has ventured into film production.

Albums 
Thanks to a solid classic training and an interest in recording techniques and new technologies, Casadesus has developed his own style, mixing acoustic instruments and electronic sound effects. During his career, he has focused on recording, in collaboration with his friends in the publishing world, Jean Claudel, founder of the label Amplitude, and Frédéric Leibovitz, founder of Cézame Music Agency. Since 2008, he has contributed to various albums from Cezame's catalogue (Marines, Seascapes, American Road Book, Paysages avec cordes, Motivation & Inspiration, Historical Heritage, 1914 : La grande guerre, Sense and Sensibility, Inspiring Cinematic Choirs, Western, Scandal & Gossip, Freaky Frolics)
 1980 : Voyage immobile
 1982 : Les oiseaux de rivière noire
 1986 : Carte blanche à Gréco Casadesus
 1995 : Projections
 1997 : The Climb 
 1998 : Marie et le vin (Un roman et sa musique)
 1999 : Babar, king of the elephants
 2003 : Symphonic Nirvana
 2005 : Les Trois Mousquetaires
 2009 : Suppléments d'âme
 2015 : David Krakauer plays Greco Casadesus
 2016 : Movements of Life

Theatre 
Greco Casadesus dedicated 14 years of his life to the stage.
 1983 : The Cherry Orchard, by Anton Tchekhov, for Tréteaux de France.
 1983 : Exit the King, by Eugène Ionesco, for Théâtre du Marais
 1984 : Androcles and the Lion, by George Bernard Shaw, for Théâtre du Marais
 1984 : Marshall, nous voilà! by Bruno Laurent, for Théâtre du Sentier des Halles
 1986 : Bajazet, by Racine, for Carré Silvia Monfort
 1986 : La comédie sans titre, by Italo Svevo, for Théâtre du Marais
 1987 : Britannicus, by Racine, for Carré Silvia Monfort
 1987 : It's a Family Affair-We'll Settle It Ourselves, by Alexander Ostrovski, for Théâtre du Marais
 1987 : Guillaume ou les Quatre saisons d'un conquérant, by Jean-Pierre Nortel, for Tréteaux de France
 1988 : The Lark (L'Alouette), by Jean Anouilh, for Tréteaux de France
 1988 : The Prince of Homburg, by Heinrich von Kleist, for Théâtre Mouffetard
 1989 : L'Avare (The Miser), by Molière, for Théâtre du Marais
 1989 : Le Mariage de Figaro, by Beaumarchais, for Tréteaux de France
 1990 : La Guerre de Troie n'aura pas lieu (The Trojan War Will Not Take Place), by Jean Giraudoux, for Tréteaux de France
 1991 : Each In His Own Way, by Luigi Pirandello, for Tréteaux de France
 1991 : Laetitia, by Peter Shaffer, for Théâtre du Rond-Point
 1992 : Tartuffe, by Molière, for Tréteaux de France
 1993 : L'Aiglon, by Edmond Rostand, for Tréteaux de France
 1995 : Lorenzaccio, by Alfred de Musset, for Tréteaux de France
 1995 : Christmas at the Cupiello's, by Eduardo de Filippo, for Théâtre du Marais
 1997 : Une répétition au théâtre du crime, by Jacques Mauclair, for Théâtre du Marais

Television and Film 
From his friendship with Roger Boutry, conductor of the Symphonic Orchestra of the Republican Guard, appeared in 1984 an opportunity to compose for a TV series on the French gendarmerie. This first experience led to numerous TV projects for all French channels : SFP, TF1, A2, FR3, France 3, France 5. His film career includes a large diversity of genres, feature films,  series, documentary films, as well as short films. His meeting with directors such as Bob Swaim, Etienne Perier, Serge Moati, Jérôme Diamant-Berger and others, have expanded his skills in film scoring.

He composed the first third movies of young French filmmaker Keyvan Sheikhalishahi, Vesper with Götz Otto, Nox with Matt Passmore and Brigitte Millar, and Divertimento, with Kellan Lutz, Torrey DeVitto, Ola Rapace, Götz Otto, Christian Hillborg and Ellie Heydon.

1984 - 1985 : L'homme au képi noir (TV series)
1984 : André Moleux, peintre, by Gérard Sergues
1985 : Maestro, by Serge Korber
1985 : Tant qu'il y aura des cerfs, by Laurent Charbonnier
1986 : Fred Connexion, by Serge Korber
1986 : Les conquérants de l'impossible : portrait de groupe, by Bernard Choquet and Bernard Dumont
1986 : Chinook, by Christian Zuccarelli
1987 : Cordée canine, by Christian Zuccarelli
1987 : Nuit d'enfer, by Philippe Guillaume
1988 - 1989 : Mystères et bulles de gomme, by Bernard Dumont (TV series)
1989 to 1994 : Intrigues, mésaventures, passion, côté cœur (TV series)
1990 : Appelez-moi Tonton, by Dominique Baron
1992 : La montée au pouvoir des femmes, by Ghislaine Guide
1992 : Cérémonie religieuse, by Bernard Dumont
1992 : Le passage du Nord-Ouest, by Bernard Dumont
1993 : Le poids du corps, by Christine François
1993 : Les dératisseurs, by Bernard Dumont
1993 : Meurtre à ciel ouvert, by Jean-Marc Seban
1994 : Meurtre à l'université,  by Jean-Marc Seban
1995 : Le silence de Lesbos, by Ghislaine Guidez
1995 : Les louves, by Jean-Marc Seban
1995 : Un mort sur le pavé, by Jean-Marc Seban
1995 : Le Match de notre vie. by Gareth Davies
1996 : So It Is (If You Think So), by Luigi Pirandello
1996 : La Rumeur, by Étienne Périer
1996 : La passe-montagne, by Jean-Marc Seban
1997 : The Climb, by Bob Swaim
1998 : Babar, King of the elephants, by Raymond Jafelice
1998 : Les legs, by Bernard Dumont
1998 : Le dernier fils, by Étienne Périer
2000 : L'Enfant de la honte, by Claudio Tonetti
2000 : Que reste-t-il..., by Étienne Périer
2000 : La vie à plein temps, by Serge Moati
2001 : Jésus, by Serge Moati
2001 : Les Trois Mousquetaires, by Henri Diamant-Berger
2009 : En terre étrangère. by Christian Zerbib
2010 : Petit creux (série TV, 104 épisodes)
2011 à 2013 : Le quiz de Zack (TV series)
2011 : Nos ancêtres les Gauloises, by Christian Zerbib
2013 : La Guerre d'Hollywood, by Michel Viotte
2014 : Jusqu'au dernier, by William Karel
2015 : Ta Mère! by Touria Benzari
2016 : La face, by Marc Rivière
2017 : Vesper, by Keyvan Sheikhalishahi
2019: Nox by Keyvan Sheikhalishahi
2020: Divertimento, by Keyvan Sheikhalishahi

References

External links 
 Official site (in French)
 Gréco Casadesus at notrecinema.com

1951 births
Living people
Musicians from Paris
Conservatoire de Paris alumni
French film score composers